Igor Brukner (born 4 October 1979) is a retired Czech professional tennis player.

Brukner reached a career-high ATP singles ranking of World No. 520 achieved on 14 August 2000, and a career-high ATP doubles ranking of World No. 259 achieved on 14 May 2001. He never successfully qualified nor received direct entry for an ATP Tour main draw match, thus playing exclusively on the ATP Challenger Tour and ITF Futures Tour, the latter being the most prevalent.

Brukner reached 1 career singles final on the ITF Futures Circuit and successfully won the title at the 2001 Slovakia F5 futures tournament. Additionally, he reached 13 career doubles finals with a record of 12 wins and 1 loss including a 1–0 record in ATP Challenger Tour finals. He won the 2001 Kamnik ATP Challenger tournament held on clay courts in Slovenia alongside compatriot Jaroslav Levinsky defeating Salvador Navarro-Gutierrez and Vincenzo Santopadre by a score of 6–3, 1–6, 6–4.

Brukner served as head coach for former WTA player Klára Koukalová also from the Czech Republoc, who reached World No. 20 in the singles rankings and won 7 career WTA titles.

ATP Challenger and ITF Futures finals

Singles: 1 (1–0)

Doubles: 13 (12–1)

References

External links

1979 births
Living people
Czech male tennis players